The Willie Mac Award is named in honor of Willie McCovey.  It has been presented annually since 1980 to the most inspirational player on the San Francisco Giants, as voted upon by Giants players, coaches, training staff, and more recently, Giants fans. McCovey personally presented the winner with the award in a pregame ceremony at AT&T Park near the conclusion of each season until his death on October 31, 2018.

Winners

Plaques with the names of each winner are placed in the ground surrounding the statue of Willie McCovey on the southern shore of China Basin, unofficially known as McCovey Cove.

Matt Duffy was the first rookie winner of the award.

Similar MLB awards involving Giants players
The Hutch Award is for the "active player who best exemplifies the fighting spirit and competitive desire to win".  Only Omar Vizquel and Dave Dravecky have won both the Willie Mac Award and the Hutch Award, although Willie McCovey won the Hutch Award in 1977.

Vizquel was a finalist in 2007 for the MLBPAA Heart & Hustle Award, which honors the player who "best embodies the values, spirit and tradition of the game".

See also
Baseball awards#Awards given to members of specific teams

References

External links
 Giants Awards
 Baseball Almanac listing of Willie Mac Award

Major League Baseball team trophies and awards
San Francisco Giants lists
Awards established in 1980